Agnorhiza elata (syn. Wyethia elata) is a species of flowering plants known by the common name Hall's mule's ears. It is endemic to California, where it is known only from a section of the central Sierra Nevada foothills. It occurs primarily in a region stretching from Tuolumne County to Fresno County, but a few isolated populations have been found in Tulare County.

Description
Agnorhiza elata occurs in woodlands and pine forests. It is a perennial herb growing from a thick taproot and caudex unit. The hairy stem grows erect to a maximum height around one meter. The leaves have triangular blades up to 20 centimeters long. They are coated in woolly hairs and resin glands, and the edges are smooth or slightly serrated. The inflorescence is made up of one or more flower heads. The head has lance-shaped phyllaries and has up to 20 yellow ray florets which can be up to 6 centimeters long. The fruit is an achene over a centimeter long tipped with a pappus.

References

External links
United States Department of Agriculture Plants Profile
Calphotos Photo gallery, University of California @ Berkeley

Heliantheae
Endemic flora of California
Flora of the Sierra Nevada (United States)
Natural history of the California chaparral and woodlands
Natural history of Fresno County, California
Natural history of Tuolumne County, California
Natural history of Tulare County, California
Plants described in 1912